Checkatrade may refer to:

Checkatrade.com, a directory of vetted UK tradespeople. 
Checkatrade.com Stadium, sponsored name of Broadfield Stadium, home of Crawley Town F.C.
 Checkatrade Trophy, formerly the sponsored name of the EFL Trophy